Arthez-d'Asson is a commune in the Pyrénées-Atlantiques department in the Nouvelle-Aquitaine region of south-western France.

The inhabitants of the commune are known as Arthéziens or Arthéziennes

Geography
Arthez-d'Asson is in the Ouzom Valley some 30 km south by south-east of Pau and 35 km east by south-east of Oloron-Sainte-Marie. The commune is almost entirely surrounded by the commune of Asson. Access to the commune is by road D126 which comes from Asson in the north passing through the commune and the village, continuing south up the Valley to Ferrières. The commune is almost entirely farmland although with patches of forest particularly along the river.

The Ouzom River flows through the length of the commune from south to north gathering some tributaries on the right bank, such as the Cau du Hau, the Cau du Gat, the Arriou Sec, and the Cau de la Heche, and continuing north to join the Gave de Pau near Coarraze.The Ruisseau de Thouet forms the north-western border of the commune as it flows north-east to join the Ouzom.

Places and Hamlets

 Les Aoules
 Arbes
 Arrascles dessus
 Arrecgros
 Arrecous
 Arribarrouy
 Boué
 Canet
 La Cantine
 Chartou
 Chourettes
 Chourrist
 Pé de la Coumette
 Garrenot
 Guilhamet
 Guilhem
 Habout
 Clot du Hour
 Hourna
 Jacob
 Labède
 Lacoue
 Lanot
 Larrabe
 Maupas
 Le Pont du Moulin
 Panan
 Peyré
 La Pine
 Cot de Tisnès
 Tort
 Turounet

Neighbouring communes and villages

Toponymy
The commune name in béarnais is Artés d'Asson. Michel Grosclaude indicated that the name Arthez possibly came from the mediterranean radical arte ("green oak" then  "undergrowth"), with the collective basque suffix -etz. He proposed it in the sense of "Vegetation of the undergrowth".

The following table details the origins of the commune name and other names in the commune.

Sources:
Raymond: Topographic Dictionary of the Department of Basses-Pyrenees, 1863, on the page numbers indicated in the table. 
Cassini: Cassini Map from 1750

Origins:
Saint-Pé: Cartulary of the Abbey of Saint-Pé
Lescar: Cartulary of Lescar
Fors de Béarn
Cour Majour: Regulations of the Cour Majour

History
Paul Raymond noted on page 14 of his 1863 dictionary that the commune was formed in 1749 by the union of the hamlets of Arthez-deçà and Arthez-delà from the commune of Asson.

Administration

List of Successive Mayors

Inter-communality
The commune is part of four inter-communal structures:
 the Communauté de communes du Pays de Nay;
 the AEP association of Pays de Nay-Ouest;
 the Energy association of Pyrénées-Atlantiques;
 the inter-communal association for the construction of the CES of Nay;

Demography
In 2017 the commune had 491 inhabitants.

Economy

The commune is part of the Appellation d'origine contrôlée (AOC) zone of Ossau-iraty.

Culture and Heritage
The béarnais singing group from Arthez-d'Asson Los de l'Ouzom was created during the 1980s.

Civil Heritage
There was a railway line in the commune transporting minerals from the Baburet Iron Mine.
The old Asson Ironworks was built around 1680.

Religious heritage
The Church of Saint-Paul (1906) is registered as a historical monument.

Facilities
Arthez-d'Asson has a primary school.

Notable people linked to the commune 
Jean-Paul d'Angosse, born in 1732 at Lembeye and died in 1798 at Arthez-d'Asson, was a military man, owner of an ironworks, French politician;
Armand d'Angosse, born in 1776 at Arthez-d'Asson and died in 1852 at Corbère-Abères, owner of an ironworks, French politician;
Charles d'Angosse, born in 1774 at Arthez-d'Asson and died in 1835 at Paris, owner of an ironworks, administrator and French politician.
Jean Espagnolle, born in 1828 at Ferrières and died in 1918 at Arthez-d'Asson, was a churchman, preacher, and an honorary canon;
Henri Bremond, born in 1865 at Aix-en-Provence and died in 1933 at Arthez-d'Asson, was a churchman, historian, and French literary critic, member of the Académie française.

See also
Communes of the Pyrénées-Atlantiques department

References

External links
 The Asson Ironworks on the Industrial Heritage of the Ouzom Valley website 
Arthez-d'Asson on Géoportail, National Geographic Institute (IGN) website 
St Paul d'Asson on the 1750 Cassini Map

Communes of Pyrénées-Atlantiques